Víctor Manuel Martínez (born 1 June 1975) is an Andorran former middle-distance runner. He represented his country at three World Championships. In addition, he won multiple medals at the Games of the Small States of Europe.

International competitions

Personal bests
Outdoor
400 metres – 55.08 (Marsa 2010)
800 metres – 1:48.69 (Mataró 1999)
1500 metres – 3:43.89 (Cottbus 2001)
One mile – 4:04.0 (Pamplona 2004)
10 kilometres – 32:04 (Andorra La Vella 2009)

References

All-Athletics profile

1975 births
Living people
Andorran male middle-distance runners
World Athletics Championships athletes for Andorra